The IWA Mid-South Tag Team Championship is a tag team title in the IWA Mid-South promotion. The title debuted in 1997, but was abandoned before the year was out, and had a brief revival in 2002. The title was brought back from 2004 to 2008 and then once again from 2017-Present. When it was reactivated in 2017 it was done via the Candido Cup, an 8-team tournament held on April 27, 2017. There have been a total of 44 reigns shared between 35 different teams consisting of 67 distinctive champions and five vacancies. The current champions are Dale Patricks and Kevin Giza who are in their first reign as a team.

Inaugural tournament
On July 18, 1997 at the Gore Fest 1997 show in Louisville, KY, an eight team elimination tag team tournament was held to crown the first IWA Mid-South Tag Team Champions.

Title history

Combined reigns 

By team
{| class="wikitable sortable" style="text-align: center"
!Rank
!Team
!No. ofreigns
!Combined days
|-
!1
| The Top Guys/The PD Express/The Player's Club || 4(5) || 643
|-
!2
| The Iron Saints || 3 || 496
|-
!3
|style="background-color:#FFE6BD"| Team Lotttttttaaaaa Respect  † || 1 || + 
|-
!4
| Brad Bradley, Ryan Boz and Trik Davis || 1 || 148
|-
!5
| Ian Rotten and Mad Man Pondo || 1 || 147
|-
!6
| Alice Crowley and Becky Idol || 1 || 141
|-
!7
| Mean And Hard || 3 || 134
|-
!8
| The Wild Cards || 1 || 119
|-
!9
| The Misfits || 1 ||style="background-color:#bbeeff| ¤0-118
|-
!rowspan=2|10
| The Monsters || 1 || 111
|-
| The Gym Nasty Boyz || 1 || 111
|-
!12
| The Bad Breed || 2 || 90
|-
!13
| Mama's Boiz  || 2 || 79
|-
!14
| Outlaw Inc. || 1 || 78
|-
!15
| Mance Warner and Zodiak || 1 || 56
|-
!rowspan=2|16
| Hot Chocolate || 1 || 49
|-
| Jake Crist and John Wayne Murdoch || 1 || 49
|-
!rowspan=2|18
| The War Machines || 1 || 48
|-
| Unfortunate Pairing || 1 || 48
|-
!rowspan=2|20
| The Murphy Boyz || 1 || 44
|-
| Vulgar Display of Power || 1 || 44
|-
!22
| FireArms || 1 || 43
|-
!rowspan=2|23
| The BLKOUT || 1 || 42
|-
|The Young Dragons || 1 || 42
|-
!25
| The Mason Dixon Line  || 1 || 40
|-
!26
| Harry Palmer and Mark Wolf || 1 ||style="background-color:#bbeeff| ¤0-28
|-
!rowspan=2|27
| Corey Storm and Jake Crist || 1 || 21
|-
| Josh Abercrombie, Mickie Knuckles and Devon Moore || 1 || 21
|-
!29
| The Rejects  || 1 || 20
|-
!30
| GK Fam || 1 || 19
|-
!31
| Dakota Bostock and Shane Mercer || 1 || 14
|-
!32
| The 4Gotten || 1 || 12
|-
!33
| Tarek The Great and Ian Rotten || 1 || 8
|-
!34
| Cash Flo and Ian Rotten || 1 || 7
|-
!35
| Southern Comfort || 1 || 1
|-
!36
| Up in Smoke || 1 ||style="background-color:#bbeeff| ¤N/A
|-

By wrestler 
{|class="wikitable sortable" style="text-align: center"     
!Rank
!Wrestler
!data-sort-type="number"|No. ofreigns
!data-sort-type="number"|Combineddays	
|-
!rowspan=2|1
| Logan James || 2 || 547
|-
| Tyler Matrix || 2 || 547
|-
!rowspan=2|3
| Vito Thomaselli || 3 || 496
|-
| Sal Thomaselli || 3 || 496
|-
!5
|style="background-color:#FFE6BD"| Kevin Giza † || 3 || +
|-
!6
|style="background-color:#FFE6BD"| Dale Patricks † || 2 || +
|-
!7
| Adam Slade || 3 || 278
|-
!rowspan=2|8
| Brad Bradley || 2 || 259
|-
| Ryan Boz || 2 || 259
|-
!10
| Ian Rotten || 5 || 252
|-
!11
| Eddie Kingston || 2 || 197
|-
!12
| Trik Davis || 1 || 148
|-
!13
| Mad Man Pondo || 1 || 147
|-
!rowspan=2|14
| Alice Crowley || 1 || 141
|-
| Becky Idol || 1 || 141
|-
!rowspan=2|16
| Mitch Page || 3 || 134
|-
| Rollin' Hard || 3 || 134
|-
!18
| Blackjack Marciano || 1 || 119
|-
!rowspan=2|19
| Derek Domino || 1 ||style="background-color:#bbeeff| ¤0-118
|-
| Harley Lewis || 1 ||style="background-color:#bbeeff| ¤0-118
|-
!rowspan=2|21
| Timmy Lou Retton || 1 || 111
|-
| White Mike || 1 || 111
|-
!23
| Myron Reed || 2 || 92
|-
!24
| Axl Rotten || 2 || 90
|-
!rowspan=2|25
| Joe Travis || 2 || 79
|-
| Joshie Boy || 2 || 79
|-
!27
| Homicide || 1 || 78
|-
!28
| Jake Crist || 1 || 70
|-
!29
| John Wayne Murdoch || 2 || 68
|-
!rowspan=2|30
| Mance Warner || 1 || 56
|-
| Zodiak || 1 || 56
|-
!rowspan=3|32
| Billy The P || 1 || 49
|-
| Lukas Jacobs || 1 || 49
|-
| Sugar Dunkerton || 1 || 49
|-
!rowspan=4|35
| Elliott Paul || 1 || 48
|-
| Pat Monix || 1 || 48
|-
| War Machine #1 || 1 || 48
|-
|War Machine #2 || 1 || 48
|-
!rowspan=4|39
| Brain Damage || 1 || 44
|-
| Cameron Murphy || 1 || 44
|-
| Carson Murphy || 1 || 44
|-
| Deranged || 1 || 44
|-
!43
| Trey Miguel || 1 || 43
|-
!rowspan=3|44
| Joker || 1 || 42
|-
| Josh Crane || 1 || 42
|-
| Ricky Reyes || 1 || 42
|-
!rowspan=2|47
| Devan Dixon || 1 || 40
|-
| Silas Mason || 1 || 40
|-
!rowspan=2|49
| Harry Palmer || 1 ||style="background-color:#bbeeff| ¤0-28
|-
| Mark Wolf || 1 ||style="background-color:#bbeeff| ¤0-28
|-
!rowspan=4|51
| Corey Storm || 1 || 21
|-
| Devon Moore || 1 || 21
|-
| Josh Abercrombie || 1 || 21
|-
| Mickie Knuckles || 1 || 21
|-
!55
| Reed Bentley || 1 || 20
|-
!rowspan=2|56
| Prima Donny || 1 || 19 
|-
| Piper || 1 || 19 
|-
!rowspan=2|58
| Dakota Bostock || 1 || 14
|-
| Shane Mercer || 1 || 14
|-
!rowspan=2|60
| Aidan Blackhart || 1 || 12
|-
| Justin Storm || 1 || 12
|-
!62
|Tarek The Great || 1 || 8
|-
!63
| Cash Flo || 1 || 7
|-
!rowspan=2|64
| Chris Hamrick || 1 || 1
|-
| Tracy Smothers || 1 || 1
|-
!rowspan=2|66
| Cheech || 1 ||style="background-color:#bbeeff| ¤N/A
|-
| Cloudy || 1 ||style="background-color:#bbeeff| ¤N/A
|-

References

External links
IWA Mid-South Tag Team Title History at Cagematch.net

IWA Mid-South championships
Tag team wrestling championships